The phialide (diminutive of phiale, a broad, flat vessel) is a flask-shaped projection from the vesicle (dilated part of the top of conidiophore) of certain fungi.  It projects from the mycelium without increasing in length unless a subsequent increase in the formation of conidia occurs.

It is the end cell of a phialosphore.

See also
Ascomycete

References

Fungal morphology and anatomy